Heppnerographa ecuatorica is a species of moth of the family Tortricidae. It is found in Ecuador.

The wingspan is about 12.5 mm. The ground colour of the forewings is yellowish brown, but paler beyond the end of the median cell near a whitish streak. The hindwings are brownish cream, but more fuscous outwards.

References

Moths described in 1999
Heppnerographa